Christine Winkler is an Austrian para-alpine skier. She represented Austria at the 1980 Winter Paralympics and at the 1984 Winter Paralympics. She competed in three events in 1980 and in three events in 1984. She won a medal in each event; in total, she won three gold medals and three silver medals.

Achievements

See also 
 List of Paralympic medalists in alpine skiing

References

External links 
 

Living people
Year of birth missing (living people)
Place of birth missing (living people)
Paralympic alpine skiers of Austria
Alpine skiers at the 1980 Winter Paralympics
Alpine skiers at the 1984 Winter Paralympics
Medalists at the 1980 Winter Paralympics
Medalists at the 1984 Winter Paralympics
Paralympic silver medalists for Austria
Paralympic gold medalists for Austria
Paralympic medalists in alpine skiing
Austrian female alpine skiers
Austrian amputees
20th-century Austrian women
21st-century Austrian women